Andy Stochansky is a musician and songwriter from Toronto, living in Los Angeles.

Early years 
Born and raised in Toronto, Stochansky began tinkering with the family piano at the age of five. To stop him from making music with anything he could get his hand on, his parents bought him a toy drum kit. By the time he was in his 20s, he had become a touring studio musician for Ani DiFranco. With DiFranco, Stochansky played 150 shows a year for seven years, until he felt it was time to start expressing himself beyond the drums.

Solo Career 
He switched instruments, taking up guitar and piano, and released his solo debut album, RadioFusebox. Critics called it one of the best albums of the year. Kim Hughes put him on the cover of Now Newspaper. Joan Anderman from the Boston Globe called him "the best thing at SXSW". RadioFusebox won the 2000 Canadian Juno Award for Best Album Design (Michael Wrycraft - Creative Director). 

"The press was so amazing but I wanted to switch gears and make a pop record, something definitely different. The day after my final Fusebox Tour show, I started writing something on the long drive home that would set me on course for the next few years. I wanted something with hook. I wanted feel good music. I wanted something which made people move, so I wrote Stutter and that opened the flood gates".

Stochansky quickly had 25 new songs and wanted to let anyone hear them. He was approached by an independent promoter in California who wanted to know if he would play six shows in and around Los Angeles. On the second night of that tour, Stochansky was approached by three different record companies, all wanting to sign him. One of these was RCA Victor.

In the summer of 2001, 5 Star Motel was released. The album was produced by Ian Lefevre. Two songs, "Wonderful (It's Superman)", produced by Dennis Herring, and "Stutter," produced by Tom Rothrock, received considerable radio attention. Songs from this record would appear in TV shows and movie soundtracks. Stochansky kept writing: "Anywhere, anytime I would have the guitar in my hands or steal away with headphones and mini keyboard I was truly addicted".

Stochansky chose Goo Goo Dolls frontman Johnny Rzeznik to produce his follow-up album, 100'. Out of all the people I talked to to produce this, his absolute love of songwriting, had me sold. Although the album was completed and mastered, a restructuring of the RCA record company (because of Napster), along with the firing of the very people who signed him, put Stochansky out on his own. The first would-be single from 100, "Shine," was covered by Australian artist Shannon Noll. The song was an immediate hit and holds the record for most weeks at Number One on the Australian Airplay Chart. A second single, "House of Gold", received radio success for Stochansky himself when released in Canada on the Canadian independent label Linus. Noll would have another Top 10 single again the following year when he covered "Loud", another song from 100.

 Writing career 
Stochansky is solely concentrating on writing / producing for and with other artists. He resides full-time in Los Angeles. 

His writing highlights include:

"Pale" and "Wherever You Go", both co-written with Lola Lennox and produced by Annie Lennox, received considerable BBC radio airplay.
"The Best" (featuring Dragonette) - first worldwide single for Lenno (Casablanca / Universal) 
"Northern Lights" a song chosen for the Twilight Breaking Dawn soundtrack, performed by Cider Sky 
"Hyper Love (feat. Nat Dunn)" single for Ferry Corsten on "Flashover Recordings" – Billboard Dance Top 10 
"BulletproofAngel" – "Goo Goo Dolls" from 2013 cd Magnetic 
"Shine" – Shannon Noll (11 consecutive weeks at Number One on the Australian Airplay Chart – a record that still remains today)
"Everybody Feeling Something" single "Your Only Love" – "Marlon Roudette" (Columbia Rec US) 
"There's Nothing Wrong" - "Eleven Past One" - 2nd single (Warner Music World wide) 
"Beautifully Crazy"- the first single for JP Hoe (Maple Music/Universal) 
"Parachute" – "James Durbin" from 2013 first single (Wind Up Records / Sony Music) 
"Still Your Song", "One Night", and "Home", which was the first single on Goo Goo Dolls' Something for the Rest of Us cd. "Home" made the Billboard Top 10. 
"Other Side of Crazy" – "Anastacia" 2014 CD Resurrection BMG 
"Kick This Love" – "Gin Wigmore" from "Gravel And Wine" (bonus tracks version) 2013 Universal Music US 
"Midnight Girl" and "Great Bright Morning" recorded by Casey Abrahms (Concord Music Group) 
"Beautiful Like You" – Lee Dewyze (American Idol winner) for his Live It Up cd (single) 
"Liar" – Eden's Edge (Big Machine Nashville) 
"Lullaby" - (2 versions - full / acoustic) on UK artist Ronan Keatings "Fire" cd 
"Lose It" – Waylon single (first Dutch artist ever signed to Motown) 
"Un Nouveau Jour" – Merwan Rim feat. Jamie Hartman single (Mercury France) 
"Loud" – Top 10 single off Shannon Noll's third album
"Amazing" – Vanessa Amorosi (Universal) first single 
"Neighbourhood" (single) and "Jokes on You" – Dewi (Universal Netherlands) 
"22 Steps" – Damien Leith (Sony BMG) (first single) 
"Until The Last Falling Star" – Matthew Perryman Jones The Distance in Between and Grey's Anatomy (Season 7 / Episode 4 ) 
"Lets Funk This Up" – "Robots Get The Girls" single (EMI South Africa) 
"Let's Get Back" (first single) "Last Surrender" and "I'm Giving In" – Matt Andersen (True North Records)

White Elephant Orchestra

Stochansky's newest project, White Elephant Orchestra, is an art-pop project which released a new album, entitled Debut. Highlights included singles being played by NPR World Cafe, and KCRW KEXP radio airplay. Written, produced and played by Stochansky, Debut features Lola Lennox and Martina Sorbara (Dragonette) on back-up vocals and tracks mixed by Grammy Award-winning mixing engineer Dave Pensado (Michael Jackson, Pink, Peaches).

 Writing career 
Stochansky is also a writer and producer for and with other artists.

DiscographyWhile You Slept (1996)Radio Fusebox (1999)Five Star Motel (2002)Shine EP (2004)100 (2005)Debut'' (2020)

References

External links
 White Elephant Orchestra website

1965 births
Living people
musicians from Toronto
Canadian singer-songwriters
Canadian rock singers
Canadian folk drummers
Canadian rock drummers
21st-century Canadian drummers
Private Music artists
Canadian male drummers
21st-century Canadian composers
21st-century Canadian guitarists
Canadian male singer-songwriters
20th-century Canadian drummers
20th-century Canadian composers
20th-century Canadian guitarists
20th-century Canadian male singers
20th-century Canadian pianists
21st-century Canadian pianists
Canadian male guitarists
Canadian male pianists
21st-century Canadian male singers